Amblyglyphidodon aureus also known as the golden damselfish is a species of marine fish in the family Pomacentridae, the damselfishes and clownfishes. It is native to the central Indo-Pacific.

Description
This fish reaches  in length. It is yellow with blue or purple spots on its face. Some individuals have dark blotches on their sides.

Biology
The fish lives in outer reef habitat, deep lagoons, and areas where there is an ocean current. It lives among gorgonians, laying its eggs on them, and then the male guards and tends them until they hatch. The diet is made up of zooplankton. It is solitary or lives in small groups.

References

External links

 

aureus
Fish described in 1830
Taxa named by Georges Cuvier